Luke Juriga (born June 7, 1997) is an American football center for the San Antonio Brahmas of the XFL. He was signed by the Philadelphia Eagles as an undrafted free agent in 2020 following his college football career with the Western Michigan Broncos.

College career
Juriga played three seasons at Western Michigan at right guard, earning Second-team All-Mid-American Conference honors in 2017 and First-team All-MAC in 2018. Before his senior season, he moved to center and was named team captain. Juriga was named to the First-team All-MAC as well as the program's Greg Jennings Outstanding Offensive Player award. He finished his career starting all 52 games played and was a four-time Academic All-MAC performer. Juriga was named to the East-West Shrine Bowl in January 2020.

Professional career

Philadelphia Eagles 
Juriga signed with the Philadelphia Eagles as an undrafted free agent following the 2020 NFL Draft on April 26, 2020. He was waived during final roster cuts on September 3, 2020, and re-signed to the team's practice squad three days later. He was promoted to the active roster on October 3, 2020. In Week 11 against the Cleveland Browns, Juriga entered the game at the end of the first half following a minor injury to Jason Kelce.

On August 17, 2021, Juriga was waived/injured by the Eagles and placed on injured reserve. He was released on August 21. He was re-signed to the practice squad on December 1.

San Antonio Brahmas 
On November 17, 2022, Juriga was drafted by the San Antonio Brahmas of the XFL.

Personal life
Juriga's father Jim played for three seasons in the NFL.

References

External links
Philadelphia Eagles bio
Western Michigan Broncos football bio

1997 births
Living people
Sportspeople from Aurora, Illinois
Players of American football from Illinois
American football centers
Western Michigan Broncos football players
Philadelphia Eagles players
San Antonio Brahmas players